The Police Community of the Americas  or Ameripol is a hemispheric mechanism of cooperation police organization created in 2007.

Mission: The Police Community of the Americas - AMERIPOL is a hemispheric mechanism of cooperation, which purpose is to promote and enhance police cooperation in terms of technical-scientific facts, training, exchange of information and progress in terms of legal assistance to guide strategic and operational work against threats to public and citizen safety.

Vision: For the year 2015, the Police Community of the Americas - AMERIPOL will be constituted as an excellent organism of Police cooperation for the joint deployment of strategies against organized crime and transnational crime in the Americas, supported in this work from every police force and homologous institution, thereby ensuring calmness to citizens.

Representatives of 18 countries formalized the creation of Ameripol on 14 November 2007 in Bogotá, Colombia.

Member police forces 

 Fuerza de Policía Real de Antigua y Barbuda
 Argentine National Gendarmerie
 Departamento de Policía de Belice
 Policía Boliviana
 Departamento de Polícia Federal
 Carabineros de Chile
 National Police of Colombia
 Fuerza Pública de Costa Rica
 Organismo de Investigación Judicial
 Policía Nacional Revolucionaria de Cuba
 Policía Nacional de Ecuador
 National Civil Police of El Salvador
 Drug Enforcement Administration
 Policía de Puerto Rico
 Policía Nacional Civil de Guatemala
 Fuerza de Policía de Guiana
 Haitian National Police
 Policía Nacional de Honduras
 Fuerza Constabularia de Jamaica
 Federal Police (Mexico)
 National Police of Nicaragua
 Policía Nacional de Panamá
 Panamanian Public Forces
 Policía Nacional del Paraguay
 National Police of Peru
 Policía Nacional de República Dominicana
 Fuerza de Policía Real de San Cristóbal y Nieves
 Fuerza de Policía Real de Santa Lucia
 Policía Nacional de Uruguay
 Servicio de Policía de Trinidad y Tobago

Observer agencies 

 BKA (Oficina Federal de Investigación Criminal de Alemania)
 Royal Canadian Mounted Police
 CLACIP (Comunidad Latinoamérica y del Caribe de Inteligencia Policial
 (Comisión de Jefes/as, Directores/as de Policía de Centroamérica, México, el Caribe y Colombia)
 National Police Corps of Spain
 Civil Guard (Spain)
 Europol (Oficina de Policía de Europa)
 Guardia di Finanza
 International Association of Chiefs of Police
 Carabinieri
 Dirección Central del Servicio Antidrogas de Italia
 Organization of American States
 Interpol
 RSS (Sistema de Seguridad Regional)
 Ministry of the Interior of France
 Cuerpo de Servicios Policiales de Holanda
 Policía Nacional de Suecia
 Polícia de Segurança Pública
 Center for Research and National Security
 Policía Principat d'Andorra

Executive Secretaries and presidents 
Executive Secretaries:
Rolando Alexandre de Souza

President:
General Commander Andrés Severino

See also 
Europol, a similar Europe-wide organization.
Interpol
North American Union

References

External links
 

Organizations established in 2007
International law enforcement agencies
Law enforcement organizations